The Dewey Monument is a memorial statue in San Francisco, California, located at the center of Union Square.  Union Square is bounded by Geary, Powell, Post and Stockton Streets.  The monument is dedicated to Admiral George Dewey and commemorates his victory in the Battle of Manila Bay during the Spanish–American War.  Work on the monument began in 1901 and it was dedicated in 1903.

History and description

The monument was erected to honor Admiral George Dewey, a hero of the Spanish–American War, for his victory in the Battle of Manila Bay. 

On May 23, 1901, President William McKinley visited San Francisco to break ground for the monument. Six months later McKinley was assassinated and was succeeded by his vice president, Theodore Roosevelt. On May 14, 1903, Roosevelt officially dedicated the monument, which "commemorates the victory of Admiral George Dewey and the American fleet over Spanish forces at Manila Bay, the Philippines, on May 1, 1898, during the Spanish–American War" and also is a tribute to the sailors of the United States Navy.

Robert Ingersoll Aitken was hired to sculpt a  statue representing Nike, the ancient Greek Goddess of Victory in honor of McKinley and Dewey. The statue holds a trident that represents Dewey and a wreath that represents McKinley. Legend holds that Aitken hired Alma de Bretteville Spreckels to model for the statue, but a 1902 article detailing the monument's construction stated that Aitken's model was Clara Petzold, who later became a noted photographer. 

Architect Newton Tharp designed the base and column within a budget of $45,000.

The column stands on a square base with inscriptions on each side.

References

External links 

"Bitter Melon" - Reinterpreting The Dewey Monument In Union Square

1901 establishments in California
1901 sculptures
Landmarks in San Francisco
Outdoor sculptures in San Francisco
Sculptures of women in California
Statues in San Francisco
Union Square, San Francisco